Dava Savel is an American television producer and writer. She has written and produced for Will & Grace, That's So Raven, Sonny with a Chance, Dharma & Greg, Grace Under Fire, Dream On and Ellen for which she won a Primetime Emmy Award for co-writing "The Puppy Episode".

References

External links

American television producers
American women television producers
American television writers
Emmy Award winners
Living people
American women television writers
Year of birth missing (living people)
Place of birth missing (living people)
21st-century American women